Drocinonide is a synthetic glucocorticoid corticosteroid which was never marketed.

References

Acetonides
Diols
Corticosteroid cyclic ketals
Diketones
Fluoroarenes
Glucocorticoids
Pregnanes